Frank Lee Miller (May 13, 1886 – February 19, 1974), a.k.a. "Bullet", was 27 years old when he entered the professional baseball scene on July 12, 1913, with the Chicago White Sox.

Miller pitched only one game in the 1913 season, taking a loss. He returned to the Majors with the Pittsburgh Pirates in 1916, where he pitched an average of 30 games a year through the 1919 season.

He again left the scene for the 1920-21 seasons, but returned to the field again in 1922, this time wearing the uniform of the Boston Braves.

He played his last major league game on 30 July 1923.

He died 19 February 1974, aged 87, in his hometown, Allegan, Michigan and was interred in Rowe Cemetery, Cheshire Township, Allegan County, Michigan.

External links

 Baseball Almanac: Frank Lee Miller

Major League Baseball pitchers
People from Allegan, Michigan
Boston Braves players
Chicago White Sox players
Pittsburgh Pirates players
Baseball players from Michigan
1886 births
1974 deaths
Houghton Giants players
Green Bay Tigers players
Rockford Reds players
Des Moines Boosters players
San Francisco Seals (baseball) players
Montreal Royals players